Aleksei Valentinovich Vanyushin (born 3 January 1982) is a Russian former professional footballer.

Club career
He played in the Russian Football National League for FC Metallurg Krasnoyarsk in 2001.

He made his debut for FC Krylia Sovetov Samara on 2 April 2003 in a Russian Premier League Cup game against FC Rotor Volgograd.

References

External links
 

1982 births
People from Orekhovo-Zuyevo
Living people
Russian footballers
Russia under-21 international footballers
Association football midfielders
FC Znamya Truda Orekhovo-Zuyevo players
FC Spartak-2 Moscow players
FC Yenisey Krasnoyarsk players
FC Mostransgaz Gazoprovod players
PFC Krylia Sovetov Samara players
FC Fakel Voronezh players
FC Atyrau players
FC Saturn Ramenskoye players
Kazakhstan Premier League players
Russian expatriate footballers
Expatriate footballers in Kazakhstan
Russian expatriate sportspeople in Kazakhstan
FC Amur Blagoveshchensk players
Sportspeople from Moscow Oblast